Kaja or Kája is a given name and surname. Kaja is regarded as a Polish feminine given name that is a diminutive form of Karolina, a derivative of Karl . Kája is a Czech unisex given name that is a diminutive form of Karolína, Karla and Karel, also derivatives of Karl.

Kaja also has other root name derivations. Kaja is a Slovene feminine given name that is a short form of Kajetana, Karla and Katarina, names deriving from Caietanus (Cajetan), Karl and Aikaterine, respectively. It is also a Danish, Finnish, German, Norwegian and Swedish feminine given name that is a diminutive form of Katherina, Karen and Katrine as well as an alternate form of Kaia, all derived from Aikaterine. In Estonian, Kaja is a form of Katariina, but it also means "echo". Notable people referred to by this name include the following:

Given name

Kaja Draksler (born 1987), Slovenian pianist and composer
Kaja Eržen (born 1994), Slovenian football player
Kaja Foglio (born 1970), American writer, artist, and publisher
Kaja Grobelna (born 1995), Belgian volleyball player of Polish origin
Kaja Gunnufsen (born 1989), Norwegian singer and songwriter
Kaja Jerina (born 1992), Slovenian football player
Kaja Kajzer (born 2000), Slovenian judoka
Kaja Kallas (born 1977), Estonian politician
Kaja Korošec (born 2001), Slovenian football player 
Kaja Kreisman (born 1968), Estonian politician 
Kaja Juvan (born 2000), Slovenian tennis player
Kaja Martin, American actor, comedian, writer, director, and film producer
Kaja Norbye (born 1999), Norwegian alpine skier
Kaja Norum (born 1989), Norwegian model and figurativist painter
Kaja Rogulj (born 1986), Croatian football player
Kája Saudek (1935–2015), Czech comics illustrator and graphic artist
Kaja Silverman (born 1947), American art historian and critical theorist
Kaja Skrzek (born 1998), Polish diver
Kaja Tael (born 1960), Estonian philologist, translator, and diplomat
Kaja Verdnik (born 1999), Slovenian snowboarder
Kaja Ziomek (born 1997), Polish speed skater

Nickname
Karoline "Kaja" Eidé Norena (1884–1968), Norwegian soprano

Surname
Demasq Kaja (died 1327), a member of the Chobanid family
Egli Kaja (born 1997), Albanian football player
Ervis Kaja (born 1987), Albanian football player
Florina Kaja (born 1982), American reality television personality
Jan Kaja (born 1957), Polish painter
Ryszard Kaja (1962–2019), Polish artist, stage designer, and costume designer

See also

Mila Kajas
Kaia (name)
Kaija
Kaj (name)
Kaji (surname)

References

Czech feminine given names
Czech masculine given names
Danish feminine given names
Estonian feminine given names
Finnish feminine given names
German feminine given names
Norwegian feminine given names
Polish feminine given names
Slovene feminine given names
Swedish feminine given names